BJB may refer to:
BJB College or Buxi Jagabandhu Bidyadhar College, Odisha, India
BJB Regional Mexicana, former name of XEBJB-AM, a radio station in Monterrey, Nuevo León, Mexico
Babari Banda railway station, Khyber Pakhtunkhwa, Pakistan, station code 'BJB'
Barngarla language, ISO 639 code 'bjb'
Beijing North railway station, China, Pinyin station code 'BJB'
Bojnord Airport, Iran, IATA code 'BJB'